Fateh Khan or Dera Fateh Khan is a town and union council of Dera Ghazi Khan District in the Punjab province of Pakistan. The town is part of Taunsa Tehsil. It is located at 31°4'0N 70°43'0E and has an altitude of 140 metres (462 feet).

It is named after Baloch mercenary Fateh Khan, son of Malik Sohrab Dodai, who founded the town.

References

Populated places in Dera Ghazi Khan District
Union councils of Dera Ghazi Khan District
Cities and towns in Punjab, Pakistan